Māgh is the eleventh month of the Nanakshahi calendar, which governs the activities within Sikhism. This month coincides with Magha in the Hindu calendar and the Indian national calendar, and January and February in the Gregorian and Julian calendars and is 30 days long.

Important events during this month

January
January 14 (1 Māgh) - The start of the month Magh
January 31 (19 Māgh) - Birth of Guru Har Rai Ji

February
February 11 (30 Māgh) - Birthday of Sahibzada Ajit Singh Ji 
February 12 (1 Phaggan) - The end of the month Magh and the start of Phaggan

See also
Punjabi calendar

References

External links
www.srigranth.org SGGS Page 133
www.sikhcoalition.org

Months of the Nanakshahi calendar
Sikh terminology